They is a third-person, personal pronoun

They may also refer to:

Literature
 "They" (poem), a 1917 poem by Siegfried Sassoon
 "They" (Heinlein), a 1941 short story by Robert A. Heinlein
 "They" (Kipling), a 1904 short story by Rudyard Kipling, published in Traffics and Discoveries

Music
THEY., an R&B duo from Los Angeles, California
They (album), a 1988 album by King Missile
"They" (song), a 2005 single by Jem

Film
They (1993 film), a 1993 television drama, adapted into a film known as They Watch
They (2002 film), a 2002 horror film
They (2017 film), a 2017 American film

Other uses
"They", the former name of Immortal, a professional wrestling stable
"They", the outgroup in New World Order conspiracy theories

See also
 The Y (disambiguation)